A Lord of Parliament was the holder of the lowest form of peerage, entitled as of right to take part in sessions of the pre-Union Parliament of Scotland. Since that Union in 1707, it has been the lowest rank of the Peerage of Scotland, ranking below a viscount. A Lord of Parliament is said to hold a Lordship of Parliament.

Details
The peerage of Scotland differs from those of England and Ireland, in that its lowest rank is not that of baron. In Scotland, the term "baron" refers to a feudal baron, considered to be a minor lord who is not a peer, approximately equal to a baron in some continental countries. The Scottish equivalent to the English baron is the Lord of Parliament.

A male holder of such a lordship is designated a "Lord of Parliament," while there is no similar designation for female holders. Lords of Parliament are referred to as Lord X, while female holders of Lordships of Parliament are known as Lady X. The wife of a Lord of Parliament is also Lady X. Children of Lords of Parliament and female holders of Lordships of Parliament are styled The Honourable [Forename] [Surname], except that the heir apparent to the peerage is styled The Master of [peerage title]. Where succession by women is allowed, an heiress presumptive may be styled The Mistress of [peerage title]. After the death of father and/or mother, the child may continue to use the style "the Honourable".

The creation of Lordships of Parliament ceased when Scotland and England were combined into a single Kingdom of Great Britain in 1707, when their parliaments were merged.

From 1707 to 1963 the Scottish peers were represented in the House of Lords by representative peers, but from 1963 to 1999 they were all entitled to sit there. However, the House of Lords Act 1999 removed the right of hereditary peers, including Lords of Parliament, to sit in the House of Lords, except that a number of hereditary peers do still sit, following election by hereditary peers.  In 1999, two Lords of Parliament were so elected: Lord Reay and the Lady Saltoun. Following the death of Lord Reay on 10 May 2013, only Lady Saltoun remained in parliament. Lady Saltoun resigned from the House of Lords in December 2014.

No provision was made for Lords of Parliament to be specially represented in the current Scottish Parliament, but the Scotland Act 1998 provides that a person is not disqualified from membership of the Parliament merely because he or she is a peer (whether of the United Kingdom, Great Britain, England, Scotland, or Ireland).

Other uses

The term Lord/Lady of Parliament may also be used to refer to any member of the House of Lords. A prominent official example is in a Standing Order of the House of Lords: "Bishops to whom a writ of summons have been issued are not Peers but are Lords of Parliament."

See also 
 Laird
 List of Lordships of Parliament

References 

British noble titles

Politics of Scotland
Peerages in the United Kingdom